Glavanovtsi is a village (село) in northwestern Bulgaria, located in the Georgi Damyanovo Municipality of the Montana Province.

References

Villages in Montana Province